Rutledge is an unincorporated community in Sherman County, in the U.S. state of Oregon. It lies east of Grass Valley and U.S. Route 97 along Rutledge Road.

Joseph H. Rutledge was the first postmaster of the Rutledge post office, established on June 6, 1884, and discontinued on March 23, 1908. Rutledge and his family, moving to Oregon from California in 1882, had taken up residence at this site in 1883.

References

Former populated places in Sherman County, Oregon
Unincorporated communities in Sherman County, Oregon
1883 establishments in Oregon
Populated places established in 1883
Unincorporated communities in Oregon